TVE may stand for:

Television 
 Televisión Española, a Spanish state-owned public-service television broadcaster
 TVE HD, a high-definition channel run by Televisión Española
 Televisão Educativa, a defunct Brazilian TV network
 TV Edukasi, an Indonesian TV channel
 TV Everywhere, IPTV verification system
 Television Trust for the Environment, a TV production company

Other uses 
 Tickford Vehicle Engineering, an Australian joint operation between Tickford of Europe and Ford Australia
 Township and Village Enterprises, in China
 Transrapid-Versuchsanlage Emsland, Emsland Transrapid Test Facility for maglev trains in Emsland, Germany